The 2007 Tour of Siam was the third and last edition of Tour of Siam, a cycling stage race that took place in Thailand. It began on 20 January in Suphanburi and ended on 25 January 2007 in Phetchaburi. The race was sanctioned by International Cycling Union as a 2.2 race category as part of the 2006-2007 UCI Asia Tour.

Stages

Final standings

General classification

External links
 

2007 in road cycling
2007 in Thai sport